William McConico is the Chief Judge of Michigan's 36th District Court, the busiest court in Michigan and the fifth-busiest court in America. He was appointed Chief Judge by the Supreme Court of Michigan in 2019. He was appointed to the 36th district court initially by Michigan governor Jennifer Granholm in 2010.  Before he was named to the bench, McConico served in the Michigan House of Representatives from 2000–2006. Between serving as a state representative and becoming a judge, McConico served as the City Attorney for the City of Highland Park, Michigan while Highland Park was under emergency management. Bill is a 1991 graduate of University of Detroit Jesuit High School.

References

Living people
1973 births
Michigan state court judges
African-American judges
African-American state legislators in Michigan
Members of the Michigan House of Representatives
21st-century American judges
21st-century American politicians
21st-century American lawyers
21st-century African-American politicians
20th-century African-American people